Garret Chachere (born March 17, 1969) is an American football coach and former player who is currently the running backs coach at Western Kentucky.

Playing career
Chachere is an alumnus of the Tulane University and played football at the school from 1987 to 1988.

Coaching career
Chachere began his coaching career as a graduate assistant at his alma mater, Tulane University, in 1991. In 1992, Chachere accepted a position at Cheyney University of Pennsylvania where he served as both running backs and defensive backs coach before moving on to Bloomsburg University of Pennsylvania where he coached wide receivers and defensive backs for one year in 1993. In 1994, he became defensive backs coach at Bucknell University. After the 1994 season, he became linebackers coach at Nicholls State University from 1995 to 1997. In 1998, he coached wide receivers and tight ends at Northeast Louisiana.

Chachere returned to his alma mater, Tulane University, to coach linebackers and special teams from 1999 to 2006. For both the 2007 and 2008 seasons, he coached special teams at the University of Memphis. He then moved on to the University of Arizona where he coached running backs and wide receivers from 2009 to 2011. During his tenure at Arizona, he served as the chairman of the program committee for the American Football Coaches Association.

He then left to coach tight ends and special teams at the University of Southern Mississippi in 2012. On January 6, 2013 Chachere was announced as the defensive ends coach for the Golden Bears football team at the University of California, Berkeley. From 2014 to 2015, he was linebackers coach and was also named assistant head coach at California. With experience coaching both offense and defense, Chachere switched sides to coach running backs in 2016.

In February 2017, Chachere accepted his first coordinator position as the offensive coordinator and wide receivers coach at New Mexico Highlands University for the 2017 season. In January 2018, he was named the passing game coordinator and running backs coach at Southeastern Louisiana University for 2018. In January 2019, Chachere was named running backs coach at Western Kentucky University.

References

External links
 Arizona profile
 California profile
 Tulane profile

1969 births
Living people
Arizona Wildcats football coaches
Bloomsburg Huskies football coaches
Bucknell Bison football coaches
California Golden Bears football coaches
Cheyney Wolves football coaches
Louisiana–Monroe Warhawks football coaches
Memphis Tigers football coaches
New Mexico Highlands Cowboys football coaches
Nicholls Colonels football coaches
Southeastern Louisiana Lions football coaches
Southern Miss Golden Eagles football coaches
Tulane Green Wave football coaches
Tulane Green Wave football players
Western Kentucky Hilltoppers football coaches
Sportspeople from New Orleans
Players of American football from New Orleans
Brother Martin High School alumni